John Chambre (also Chamber or Chambers) (1470–1549) was an English churchman, academic and physician.

Early life
Born in Northumberland, Chambre studied at Oxford, where he was elected fellow of Merton College in 1492. Having taken holy orders, he was presented to the living of Titchmarsh, Northamptonshire.

Medical career
After graduating M.A., Chambre visited Italy, studied medicine there, and graduated at the University of Padua. On his return became physician to Henry VII of England, and retained the position under Henry VIII. He received the degree of M.D. at Oxford in 1531.

When the College of Physicians was founded in 1518, Chambre was the first named in its charter. He was censor of the College of Physicians in 1523. Some of his prescriptions for lotions and plasters were preserved in manuscript, and a letter signed by him on the health of Queen Jane Seymour.

Church career
In 1508 Chambre was given the living of Bowden in Leicestershire, from 1494 to 1509 he held the prebend of Codringham in Lincoln Cathedral, and from 1509 to 1549 that of Leighton Buzzard there; and in the same diocese, as then constituted, he held the archdeaconry of Bedford from 1525 to 1549. He was also treasurer of Wells 1510 to 1543, and in 1537 canon of Wiveliscombe; he was precentor of Exeter 1524 to 1549, canon of Windsor 1509 to 1549, Archdeacon of Meath 1540 to 1542, and dean of the collegiate chapel of St. Stephen's, Westminster.

Chambre was also Warden of Merton College, Oxford, from 1525 to 1544.

Later life
Chambre built the cloisters of St. Stephen's chapel at his own cost, but lived to see them demolished as a consequence of the Protestant Reformation. He died in 1549, and was buried in St. Margaret's, Westminster.

Notes

External links

Attribution

1470 births
1549 deaths
16th-century English Roman Catholic priests
16th-century English Anglican priests
Archdeacons of Bedford
16th-century English medical doctors
Wardens of Merton College, Oxford
Deans of St Stephen's Chapel, Westminster
Archdeacons of Meath
People from Northumberland